Jeremiah Brown House and Mill Site is a Colonial-era mill complex and national historic district at Rising Sun, Cecil County, Maryland, United States. It consists of two distinct halves: a two-story, three-bay, gable-roofed stone structure built in 1757 by Jeremiah Brown, Sr., a Quaker from Pennsylvania; and a two-story, two-bay gable-roofed frame house built in 1904 by John Clayton on the site of the original 1702 log wing.  Also on the property is a small 19th century bank barn; a reconstruction of the original mill built on top of the stone foundations of the 1734 Brown Water Corn and Gristmill; and the foundations of an 18th-century saw mill.

It was added to the National Register of Historic Places in 1987. The entire site is located within the grounds of the Plumpton Park Zoo.

References

External links
, including photo from 1995, at Maryland Historical Trust

Buildings and structures in Cecil County, Maryland
Grinding mills on the National Register of Historic Places in Maryland
Houses on the National Register of Historic Places in Maryland
Quakerism in Maryland
Historic districts on the National Register of Historic Places in Maryland
National Register of Historic Places in Cecil County, Maryland